The Government of Serbia, formally the Government of the Republic of Serbia, commonly abbreviated to Serbian Government, is the executive branch of government in Serbia.

The affairs of government are decided by the Cabinet of Ministers, which is led by the Prime Minister. The government is housed in a Ministry of Finance of Kingdom of Yugoslavia Building.

Jurisdiction
According to the Constitution of Serbia, the Government:
 Determines and guides policy
 Executes laws and other general acts of the National Assembly
 Adopts regulations and other general acts for the purpose of enforcing laws
 Proposes to the National Assembly the laws and other general acts and gives an opinion on them when submitted by another proposer
 Directs and coordinates the work of public administration bodies and supervises their work
 Performs other duties determined by the Constitution and the law

Also, the Government is responsible to the National Assembly for the policy of the Republic of Serbia, for the implementation of laws and other general acts of the National Assembly and for the work of state administration bodies.

Incumbent government

The incumbent cabinet was sworn on 26 October 2022 by a majority vote in the National Assembly. It is the third cabinet of Ana Brnabić, who became the Prime Minister month after the former Prime Minister of Serbia Aleksandar Vučić resigned from the office to become the President of Serbia, following the 2017 presidential elections.

List of ministers

Government history

List of governments of the Republic of Serbia

Governmental agencies and offices
Government of the Republic of Serbia within its ministries has over 130 governmental agencies and institutions. These are the services that operate within the Government of the Republic of Serbia (as of December 2017):
 Secretary-General Office of the Government of Serbia
 Office for Cooperation with Media
 Agency for human resources management
 Airline service of the Government of Serbia
 Directorate for joint affairs of republic authorities
 Coordination Body for the municipalities of Preševo, Bujanovac and Medveđa
 Office of the National Security and Protection of Classified Informations
 Office for Cooperation with Civil Society
 Audit Office of the European Union Asset Management System
 Office for Human and Minority Rights
 Office for Kosovo and Metohija
 Office for Coordination Affairs in the Negotiation Process with the Provisional Institutions of Self-Government in Priština
 The Office of the Council for Cooperation with the Russian Federation and the People's Republic of China
 Office of Drugs Control
 Public Investment Management Office
 Office of Information Technology and Electronic Administration

See also
 Elections in Serbia
 National Assembly
 Human Resource Management Service of the Government of Serbia

References

External links

 Government of Serbia Official website
 Serbian ministries, etc. at rulers.org

 
European governments